County Hall is a municipal building in Tallaght in the county of South Dublin, Ireland.

History
Following the implementation of the Local Government (Dublin) Act 1993, which created South Dublin County Council, the county council initially met in the Regional Technical College, Tallaght. The new building, which was designed by Gilroy McMahon, was purpose-built for the county council and completed in 1994.

References

Buildings and structures in South Dublin (county)
Tallaght